Elizabeth Darrell may refer to:

Elizabeth Darrell (maid-of-honour), mistress of the poet Sir Thomas Wyatt
Elizabeth Darrell (née de Calstone), owner of Littlecote House
Elizabeth Darrell, first wife of John Seymour (died 1491), and paternal grandmother of Queen Jane Seymour